The 2020–21 Austrian Football Bundesliga, also known as Tipico Bundesliga for sponsorship reasons, was the 109th season of top-tier football in Austria. Red Bull Salzburg were the seven-times defending champions.

Teams

Changes
Mattersburg withdrew from the Bundesliga after 17 seasons due to filing for insolvency, sparing WSG Tirol from relegation. SV Ried was promoted as champions of the 2019–20 Austrian Football Second League after having been relegated from the Bundesliga at the end of the 2016–17 season.

Stadia and locations

Managerial changes

Regular season

League table

Results

Championship round 
The points obtained during the regular season were halved (and rounded down) before the start of the playoff. As a result, the teams started with the following points before the playoff: Red Bull Salzburg 26, Rapid Wien 22, LASK 21, Sturm Graz 19, Wolfsberger AC 16, and WSG Tirol 15. The points of Rapid Wien, Sturm Graz and Wolfsberger AC were rounded down – in the event of any ties on points at the end of the playoffs, a half point will be added for these teams.

Relegation round 
The points obtained during the regular season were halved (and rounded down) before the start of the playoff. As a result, the teams started with the following points before the playoff: Hartberg 14, Austria Wien 12, St. Pölten 10, Rheindorf Altach 10, Ried 8, and Admira Wacker Mödling 7. The points of Hartberg, Austria Wien, St. Pölten and Rheindorf Altach were rounded down – in the event of any ties on points at the end of the playoffs, a half point will be added for these teams.

Europa Conference League play-offs
The winner and the runner-up of the relegation round played a one-legged play-off semi-final match against each other. The winner played a two-legged final against the fifth-placed team from the championship round to determine the qualifier to the Europa Conference League second qualifying round.

Semi-final

Final 

Austria Wien won 5–1 on aggregate.

Relegation play-offs 
Since the top two teams of the 2020–21 Austrian Football Second League did not receive a license for the Bundesliga, relegation play-offs were played between the last-placed club from the Bundesliga and the best-placed club with a license from the Second League.

Austria Klagenfurt won 5–0 on aggregate.

Statistics

Top scorers

Top assists

Awards

Annual awards

Team of the Year

References

External links
  

Austrian Football Bundesliga seasons
Aus
1